Lolipora, also known as Lolipur, is a village and a Panchayat Halqa in Pattan tehsil of Baramulla district in the Indian union territory of Jammu and Kashmir.
Sopore, Baramulla, Bandipora and Srinagar are the nearby cities to Lolipora.

Geographical location
Lolipora is located between latitude 34.216149319672°N and longitude 74.53582272547806°E . The landscape is made up of plateau like terraces known as Karewas. On the northern side of Lolipora lies the wetland Rakh-e-Hygam.

Demographics
 India Census, Lolipora has a total population of 1,340, out of which 718 are males and 622 are females. Lolipora has total of 130 family residing. The literacy rate of Lolipora is 69.2%.

Education
The Government Boys Middle School is one of the oldest School in the area imparting education to the common folks. 'Abu Baker Memorial Trust' is another middle school in the area. Besides these the educational institutes around lolipora include.
Government Boys Higher Secondary School Goshbugh.
Government Boys Higher Secondary School Pattan.
Government Boys Higher Secondary School Palhallan.

Religion
People of Lolipora follow Sunni Islam. Religious education is imparted through madrassas in the morning and evening.

References

Villages in Baramulla district